Silvia Araya  (born 6 May 1930) is a Chilean-born Canadian painter and art instructor. In the 1970s, she became involved in politics and was elected to the Chamber of Deputies in 1973, representing the then Province of Coquimbo. After the coup d'état, she was imprisoned in the infamous Valparaíso prison, before being exiled to Canada in 1977. Locating in Quebec City, Araya established the Académie des beaux-arts Silvia Araya and taught for twenty-five years. She was honored as a knight of the National Order of Quebec in 2008 for her cultural contributions to the province.

Early life
Silvia Victoria Araya González was born on 6 May 1930 in Santiago, Chile, to Julia González Jorquera and Manuel Araya Vargas. She completed her primary and secondary schooling at the Liceo  1 in Santiago and then enrolled in the fine arts program at the Secondary Institute of the University of Chile. She studied the influence of Chinese and Indian philosophy and their effects on Chilean folklore and popular art. While she was in school, she became involved in the leadership of the University of Chile Student Federation and in 1953 was elected to the federation's board to represent the fine arts department. After six years of study, she graduated from the University of Chile and then completed graduate studies in Mexico and Argentina, as well as making study-trips abroad to Europe.

Career
When she finished her education, Araya collaborated with a group of intellectuals to establish the Chilean-Indian Institute of Culture for which they produced a radio program, India al habla. She married Jorge Pinochet Lastra and the couple had five children. After living for several years in Santiago, the family moved to Linares where, in 1959, she was one of the founders of the Grupo Ancoa. The group was a cultural association of artists, musicians and intellectuals, which included Silvia Araya, Hugo Amigo, Julio Amigo, Dr. Miguel Cervantes, Bartolomé Cruces, Mario Dueñas, Temístocles Elgueta, Emilio González, Eliana Ibarra, Inge Linzt, Samuel Maldonado, Manuel Francisco Mesa Seco, Carlos Pinochet Lastra, Jorge Pinochet, Alberto Reyes Lapiedra and Carlos Sepúlveda López. In 1962, the group began working to organize an art museum holding performances and exhibits to raise funds. In 1966, Araya and other members of the group founded the Museum of Art and Artisans of Linares to showcase their works. The following year, an exhibition was hosted for the anniversary of the museum's founding which featured works by Araya, Armando Álvarez, María Esther de Barrientos, Sergio Monje Solar, and Pedro Olmos.

For fifteen years, Araya worked with the Grupo Ancoa, served as a director of the museum and exhibited her art works, participating in over thirty exhibitions. In 1970, she joined the Independent Popular Action (API) movement in Linares and served as the president of the party until 1971. From 1971 to 1973 Araya served as a member of the API's Political Commission, heading the national board of school assistance and scholarships. In 1973, she was elected to serve in the Chamber of Deputies of Chile and was appointed by president Salvador Allende as the only woman delegate to serve on the Permanent Commission of Latin American Integration and served as chair of the committee for Public Education. After the 1973 Chilean coup d'état, she was detained in Valparaíso prison before being exiled to Canada in 1977.

In 1978, Araya established the Académie des beaux-arts Silvia Araya in Quebec City, where she taught art classes for the next twenty-five years, retiring in 2003. In 1984, she opened a studio and art gallery in Les Éboulements, the first gallery in the village, which would later become an artists colony with many other galleries. Known for her portraiture, she painted images of Jean-Paul L'Allier, Gilles Lamontagne, and Jean Pelletier, having many paintings in private collections and adorning public spaces, such as those exhibited in the City Hall of Quebec City. After 1988, when Alain Decaux was appointed as Minister of the Francophonie and International Cultural Relations, Araya was honored by him with the "Alexandre Dumas" Prize for her "invaluable contributions to Quebec's culture". In 2008, she was awarded with Quebec's highest honor, when she was recognized as a knight in the National Order of Quebec.

Legacy
Two of Araya's sons, Christobal and Humberto Pinochet Araya have followed in their mother's footsteps, becoming award-winning painters in Quebec. She has both paintings and sculpture in the permanent collections of the Museum of Art and Artisans in Linares, Chile.

References

Citations

Bibliography

1930 births
Living people
Artists from Santiago
Chilean people of Spanish descent
Independent Popular Action politicians
Members of the Chamber of Deputies of Chile
Chilean emigrants to Canada
Artists from Quebec City
Canadian women painters
Canadian academics
20th-century Canadian women artists
21st-century Canadian women artists
20th-century Chilean women artists
21st-century Chilean women artists